The 2001 Lithuanian Athletics Championships were held at the S. Darius and S. Girėnas Stadium in Kaunas from July 3 to July 4, 2001.

Men

Women

Medals by city

External links
 Lithuanian athletics

Lithuanian Athletics Championships
Lithuanian Athletics Championships
Lithuanian Athletics Championships, 2001